Italy women's national softball team is one of the top-ranked softball teams in Europe.

The Italian team has won the Women's Softball European Championship and record twelve times. Their latest European title came in 2021. In 2019, the Italian team won the WBSC Olympic Softball Qualifier by beating all five opponents and eventually qualified for the Olympic tournament in Tokyo.

History
The first participation in the World Championships took place in 1974, where Italy finished in 7th place. The team competed at the 1990 ISF Women's World Championship in Normal, Illinois where they finished with 6 wins and 3 losses. The team competed at the 1994 ISF Women's World Championship in St. John's, Newfoundland where they finished eleventh. The team competed at the 1998 ISF Women's World Championship in Fujinomiya City, Japan where they finished sixth. 

The team competed at the 2002 ISF Women's World Championship in Saskatoon, Saskatchewan where they finished seventh. The team competed at the 2006 ISF Women's World Championship in Beijing, China where they finished sixth. After finishing out of the top 8 in the three following World Championship editions, Italy came back in 2018, in Chiba, and took seventh place thanks to a four-game winning streak that eliminated, among others, China from the medal contention. In the fight for sixth place, Italy was beaten by Mexico in a tight 1–0 loss after two extra-innings.

Palmarès

Italy–Netherlands rivalry

2020 Olympic roster

See also
Women's Softball European Championship
Softball at the 2000 Summer Olympics
Softball at the 2004 Summer Olympics

References

External links
 Italian national softball teams
International Softball Federation

Women's national softball teams
Soft
Softball in Italy